The Voorspoed mine is one of the largest diamond mines in South Africa and in the world. The mine is located in the center of the country in Kroonstad, Free State. The mine has estimated reserves of 10 million carats of diamonds and an annual production capacity of 800,000 carats.

References

Diamond mines in South Africa
Economy of the Free State (province)
Moqhaka
Open-pit mines